The year 701 BC was a year of the pre-Julian Roman calendar. In the Roman Empire, it was known as year 53 Ab urbe condita . The denomination 701 BC for this year has been used since the early medieval period, when the Anno Domini calendar era became the prevalent method in Europe for naming years.

Events
 King Hezekiah of Judah, backed by the 25th Dynasty, revolts against king Sennacherib of Assyria. Sennacherib sacks many outlying towns and villages of the Kingdom of Judah, such as Tel Lachish, but the Assyrian siege of Jerusalem fails when 185,000 soldiers die overnight.

Births

Deaths

References

700s BC